INF1s are elicitins, proteins which are produced by plant pathogens and recognized by hosts. They are produced by Phytophthora, Pythium, and Pseudomonas spp.

Known INF1s include:

 PsINF1, the INF1 in Pseudomonas syringae
 PiINF1, an INF1 in Phytophthora infestans
 , a MAMP INF1 in P. infestans.
 PcINF1, the INF1 in Phytophthora capsici

References 

Elicitors